Marc Rissmann (also spelled Rißmann, born 1980) is a German actor. He has appeared in films like Overlord, and TV series like The Last Kingdom, Game of Thrones, and The Man in the High Castle.

Early life and career

Marc Rissmann studied at the College of Dramatic Arts "Ernst Busch" Berlin. On stage, Rissmann performed at the Deutsches Theater in Berlin in Danton's Death In 2009, under the direction of Kay Voges, he played Lysander in the Shakespeare comedy A Midsummer Night's Dream. From 2009 to 2011, he was a permanent member of the Theater Magdeburg ensemble.

Rissmann has appeared in numerous German series early in his career, including Der letzte Bulle, SOKO – Der Prozess, and Binny and the Ghost. He then broke into the international market, with roles in The Last Kingdom, Riviera, and Into the Badlands.

In 2019, he appeared in the eighth season of Game of Thrones as Harry Strickland, the commander of the mercenary company the Golden Company, and as Wilhelm Goertzmann in season four of The Man in the High Castle.
Rissmann also works as a director – his recent works include the Please Tell Rosie music video for Alle Farben, and a commercial campaign for the German National Lotto.

Filmography

As actor

Film

Television

As director

External links

References

20th-century German male actors
21st-century German male actors
1980 births
Living people
Male actors from Berlin